Universal Air Travel Plan, Inc. (UATP) is a network that is dedicated to payments for travel related expenses such as carrier or hotel costs. It was established in 1936 as Air Travel Card.

Locations

Headquarters: Washington, D.C.

Regional offices:  Los Angeles, New Delhi, Miami, São Paulo, Geneva, Beijing, Singapore, Tokyo

Products

Products offered:
UATP Corporate Card
Travel Protection Plans
UATP Settlement Services
UATP University
ATCAN
ATCAN-ICH

External links

Payment systems
Traveling business organizations
1936 introductions
Credit card issuer associations